The Dictionary of Australian Biography, published in 1949, is a reference work by Percival Serle containing information on notable people associated with Australian history. With approximately a thousand entries, the book took more than twenty years to complete. Published by Angus and Robertson, the dictionary was compiled as two volumes, Volume 1: A-K; and Volume 2: L-Z.

The book contains 1,030 biographies of Australians, or people who were closely connected with Australia, who died before the end of 1942. According to Serle in his preface:

Format
The average length of the biographies is about 640 words. Serle classified them roughly  into the following twelve groups:

Of the above profiles, the number of women included was 42 or 4 percent of the biographies. Forty-seven percent of those included in the book were born in England, 27 percent in Australia, 12 percent Scotland, 8 percent Ireland, 1 percent Wales and remaining 5 percent were from the rest of the world which included twelve from the United States, nine from Germany, and six from New Zealand.

Other biographies
Prior to its publication similar Australian reference works included:

 Later editions were published as Who's Who in Australia.

Subsequently, other Australian biographical dictionaries have been released including the Australian Dictionary of Biography from 1966 and Who's Who in Australia.

References

External links
 Contains details of people who died before 1942.

1949 non-fiction books
Reference works in the public domain
Australian Biography, Dictionary of
Angus & Robertson books